Enrico Maria Salerno  (18 September 1926 – 28 February 1994) was an Italian actor, voice actor and film director. He was also the voice of Clint Eastwood in the Italian version of Sergio Leone's Dollars Trilogy films, and the voice of Christ in The Gospel According to St. Matthew directed by Pier Paolo Pasolini.

Biography 
Enrico Maria Salerno was born in Milan on 18 September 1926, son of Antonino Salerno, an Italian lawyer originally from Erice (in province of Trapani, Sicily) and Milka Storff, a Yugoslav violinist. At only 17, he joined the Italian Social Republic as an officer of the Republican National Guard at the AA.UU. "Varese". With the fall of the Italian Social Republic is imprisoned in the concentration camp of Coltano, near Pisa.

Actually the real name of the actor was Enrico. It was during the first theatrical experiences that he decided to place the name of Mary alongside his name, probably as an affectionate tribute to his mother Milka (corresponding to the Italian Maria).
Among the most representative figures of the Italian show in the second half of the twentieth century, in his acting career he plays 102 theatrical performances, he shoots 92 films as performer, 3 as director, countless tv-movies, hundreds of hours of TV broadcasts, hundreds of hours of Radio.

After a small collaboration with Piccolo Teatro di Milano, from 1954 to 1955 (and more years) he worked in Teatro Stabile in Genoa, with Fyodor Dostoevsky, Pirandello, William Shakespeare, Vittorio Alfieri and Giraudoux successful stage adaptations.

In 1960, with  Ivo Garrani and Giancarlo Sbragia, he founded the stage company "Nuova Compagnia degli Associati". In 1963 he starred in Who's Afraid of Virginia Woolf? by Edward Albee, co-starring Sarah Ferrati, stage direction by  Franco Zeffirelli. In 1966 he was the star of Byron's Manfred, in the role of an actor reciting the musical score by Schumann, conducted by Claudio Abbado, directed by Mauro Bolognini.

In 1970 he made his direction film debut with the love drama box office and award-winning film Anonimo Veneziano. He was directed by many great film directors, as Mario Monicelli, Roberto Rossellini, Valerio Zurlini, Florestano Vancini, Dino Risi, Dario Argento, Luigi Comencini, Luigi Magni, Antonio Pietrangeli.

In 1991 he acted as the father of  Six Characters in Search of an Author by Pirandello, directed by Franco Zeffirelli.

Personal life
Married to Fioretta Pierella, he had four children: Giovanbattista, Edoardo, Pietruccio and Nicola. He then married in Laura Andreini. He was a former boyfriend of actress and Silvio Berlusconi’s soon-to-be wife Veronica Lario.

He had three brothers: Giovanbattista (artist & art professor), Fernando (music composer) and Vittorio (film director). He had a long relationship with Valeria Valeri, with whom he had a daughter, Chiara Salerno, also a dubbing actress.

Death
Salerno died in Rome of lung cancer on 28 February 1994 at the age of 67. After his death, an award in support of contemporary drama was dedicated to his memory.

Filmography as film director 
The Anonymous Venetian (Anonimo veneziano) (1970)
Cari genitori (1973)
Eutanasia di un amore (1978)
Disperatamente Giulia TV miniseries (1989)Il barone TV miniseries (1995)

Selective filmography as actorUnknown Man of San Marino (1946) – MP Wolf (uncredited)Girls Marked Danger (La Tratta delle bianche) (1953, directed by Luigi Comencini) – Giorgio (uncredited)Human Torpedoes (1954) – VirgilioViolent Summer (Estate violenta) (1959, directed by Valerio Zurlini) – Ettore Caremoli – il padre di CarloSiege of Syracuse (L'assedio di Siracusa) (1960, directed by Pietro Francisci) – GorgiaThe Angel Wore Red (1960, directed by Nunnally Johnson) – Capt. BotargusLe signore (1960) – Renato, the make-up artistEscape by Night (Era notte a Roma) (1960, directed by Roberto Rossellini) – Doctor CostanziThe Warrior Empress (1960) – MelanchroLong Night in 1943 (La lunga notte del '43) (1960, directed by Nanni Loy) – Pino BarilariThe Ladykiller of Rome (L'Assassino) (1961, directed by Elio Petri) – (uncredited)Nude Odyssey (1961) – EnricoHercules and the Conquest of Atlantis (Ercole alla conquista di Atlantide) (1961, directed by Vittorio Cottafavi) – Re di MegaraViolent Life (1961) – Bernardini – the trade-union representative (uncredited)La bellezza di Ippolita (1962) – LucaSmog (1962, directed by Franco Rossi) – Vittorio CiocchettiEva (1962) – (uncredited)Le Masque de fer (1962) – MazarinL'amore difficile (1962) – L'uomo (segment "Le donne")Violenza segreta (1963) – ContardiIl Fornaretto di Venezia (1963) – Lorenzo BarboUrlo contro melodia nel Cantagiro '63 (1963)I maniaci (1964) – Castelli, the Succssful Novelist (segment "la parolaccia")Queste pazze pazze donne (1964) – Onorevole Casali BardiBackfire (1964) – MarioThree Nights of Love (1964) – Giuliano (segment "La moglie bambina")La costanza della ragione (1964) – MilloschiLa fuga (1965) – Lo psicanalistaSix Days a Week (1965) – Count Adriano SilveriUp and Down (1965) – Enrico (segment "Questione di Principo")Casanova 70 (1965, directed by Mario Monicelli) – Lo psicanalistaI soldi (1965)Io la conoscevo bene (1965, directed by Antonio Pietrangeli) – RobertoL'ombrellone (1965, directed by Dino Risi) – Ingegner Enrico MarlettiLo scippo (1965) – rag. LinzaloneSeven Golden Men Strike Again (1966) – Il Generale PresidenteSeasons of Our Love (1966) – Vittorio BorghiL'armata Brancaleone (1966, directed by Mario Monicelli) – ZenoneL'estate (1966) – Sergio BoldriniSex Quartet (1966) – Gianni (segment "Fata Sabina")3 pistole contro Cesare (1967) – Julius Cesar FullerThe Oldest Profession (1967) – Rak (segment "Ère préhistorique, L'")The Strange Night (1967) – CarloBandidos (1967) – Richard MartinDeath Sentence (1968) – MonteroTrain for Durango (1968) – LucasCandy (1968, directed by Christian Marquand) – Jonathan J. JohnThe Battle of El Alamein (La battaglia di El Alamein) (1969, directed by Giorgio Ferroni) – Sgt. Maj. Claudio BorriI See Naked (Vedo nudo) (1969) – Carlo Alberto RinaldoThe Bird with the Crystal Plumage (L'uccello dalle piume di cristallo) (1970, directed by Dario Argento) – Inspector MorosiniContestazione generale (1970) – Don RobertoQuell'amore particolare (1970) – Manlio SantiSo Long Gulliver (1970) – BossThe Swinging Confessors (1970) – Don CalogeroNoi donne siamo fatte così (1971) – Professor Ivano Borghi (segment "Romantica")A cuore freddo (1971) – Enrico SalvariThe Sicilian Checkmate (1972) – ProsecutorExecution Squad (1972) – Commissario BertoneThe Assassination of Trotsky (1972, directed by Joseph Losey) – SalazarHospitals: The White Mafia (1973, directed by Luigi Zampa) – Dr. GiordaniNo, the Case Is Happily Resolved (1973) – Giuseppe Ferdinando Giannoli – 'Don Peppino'The African Deal (1973) – Franco DonatiThe Police Serve the Citizens? (1973) – Nicola SironiLa polizia sta a guardare (1973) – CardoneLa notte dell'ultimo giorno (1973) – Giorgio BardelliIngrid sulla strada (1973) – UrbanoThe Body (1974) – AntoineHold-Up, instantánea de una corrupción (1974) – Mark GavinCity Under Siege (1974) – Inspector Michele ParrinoVerginità (1974) – Salvatore Cascemi (Segment 2)Salvo D'Acquisto (1974) – RubinoGambling City (1975) – The 'President'Night Train Murders (L'ultimo treno della notte) (1975, directed by Aldo Lado) – Dr. Giulio Stradi...a tutte le auto della polizia (1975) – Police Chief CarraroThe Left Hand of the Law (1975) – MinisterSavage Three (1975) – Commissario SantagàUn prete scomodo (1975) – Don Lorenzo MilaniA Sold Life (1976) – Luigi VenturaBestialità (1976) – UgoDiary of a Passion  (1976) – GiacomoChe notte quella notte! (1977) – SaverioUna donna di seconda mano (1977) – AugustoAmori miei (1978) – Antonio BianchiGros-Câlin (1979) – Le présidentTesoro mio (1979) – Avv. Roberto ManettaIl corpo della ragassa (1979) – Professor Ulderico QuarioL'ultima volta insieme (1981) – Luigi AntonelliIl carabiniere (1981) – De Michelis
 An Ideal Adventure (1982) – Eugenio ZafferiLegati da tenera amicizia (1983) – Adalberto Maria GioiaScuola di ladri (1986) – Alibrando SiraghiScuola di ladri – Parte seconda (1987) – Aliprando SiraghiIl volpone'' (1988) – Ciro Corvino

Notes

External links

 
 

1926 births
1994 deaths
Italian atheists
Italian male film actors
Italian male stage actors
Italian male voice actors
Italian film directors
Male actors from Milan
Deaths from lung cancer in Lazio
Nastro d'Argento winners
20th-century Italian male actors
Italian people of Serbian descent
People of Sicilian descent
Italian military personnel of World War II